Derek William Draper (born 15 August 1967) is an English former lobbyist. As a political advisor he was involved in two political scandals, "Lobbygate" in 1998, and again in 2009 while Draper was editor of the LabourList website. He has worked as a psychotherapist.

He is the author of two books, Blair's 100 Days and Life Support.

Draper has had an unusually serious case of long COVID; he was hospitalised in March 2020, suffering from COVID-19, and remained in hospital for a year. Six months after returning to his home, he remains seriously incapacitated as of April 2022.

Career
Born in Chorley, Lancashire, Draper was educated at Southlands High School until 1984. He later attended Runshaw College in Leyland and the University of Manchester. While at the university, Draper provided hospitality for Ken Livingstone, who had missed his train after a Labour Club meeting. Livingstone was reportedly astonished to find displayed in Draper's student room a large poster of Labour Party deputy leader, Roy Hattersley. At around this time, he first met Charlotte Raven, with whom he was later involved romantically.

Draper began his political career in 1990, when he became the constituency secretary for Nick Brown. In 1992, he left this job and went to work as a researcher for the MP for Hartlepool, Peter Mandelson. In 1996, he became a director of a lobbying firm called GPC Market Access, and was employed by them until early 1999. While working at GPC Market Access, he set up the New Labour organisation Progress with Liam Byrne. During the late 1990s, Draper worked as the Political Editor of the Modern Review, was briefly a columnist for the Daily Express, and a presenter on Talk Radio UK.

"Lobbygate"
In 1998, while still working as a director at GPC Market Access, Draper was caught on tape, with Jonathan Mendelsohn, boasting to Greg Palast – an undercover reporter from The Observer posing as a businessman – about how they could sell access to government ministers and create tax breaks for their clients. When the press got hold of the story, they dubbed it "Lobbygate". On the recording, Draper said that "there are 17 people who count in this government ... [to] say I am intimate with every one of them is the understatement of the century." Palast also wrote that Draper said, regarding his motivation: "I just want to stuff my bank account at 250 pounds an hour". According to Palast, "Draper was nothing more than a messenger boy, a factotum, a purveyor, a self-loving, over-scented clerk". Although he denied the allegations and accused The Observer of attempting to entrap him, he was widely ridiculed in the aftermath. Palast later stated that the subsequent media coverage got his original story wrong, and that it was not primarily about boastful lobbyists: "the real story was about Tony Blair and his inner circle".

Following his involvement in the "Lobbygate" scandal, Draper was sacked from his job at the Daily Express and generally shunned by Labour insiders. His friend Peter Mandelson said that Draper "has a fine intelligence, but sometimes I am afraid he misuses that intelligence. He gets above himself. But now he has been cut down to size and I think probably he will learn a very hard lesson from what has happened."

After politics
After leaving politics, Draper retrained as a psychotherapist, obtaining an MA in clinical psychology after what he described as "three years in Berkeley, California". While in Berkeley, he worked as "the development director of a community counselling centre"; later, he claimed to have entered "private practice in Marylebone, London". He subsequently clarified that he in fact studied at the Wright Institute of California, a graduate school in the town of Berkeley founded by Nevitt Sanford. Draper responded to the controversy surrounding his claimed psychotherapy degree, by denying the allegations completely and saying that this was "a brazen attempt to smear me by Guido Fawkes and David Hencke". He stated in 2009 that he was considering taking legal action against them.

Draper is a member of the British Association for Counselling and Psychotherapy (BACP). He writes an occasional column for the Mail on Sunday newspaper on psychotherapy issues and also wrote monthly columns in the magazines Psychologies and Therapy Today. He is also the author of a chapter in The Future of the NHS.

In response to a formal complaint the BACP announced on 24 November 2009 that it had  It further clarified Draper's qualifications: 

During the 2005 general election campaign, Draper urged people to vote tactically against Labour, saying, "I don't want my vote to be used as vindication for Tony Blair, I'd like him to wake up after the election and feel like a hunted man".

On 7 June 2009, emails that were highly critical of Gordon Brown that Peter Mandelson sent Draper in January 2008 were leaked to the News of the World which claimed that Brown was "insecure" and a "self-conscious person, physically and emotionally".

LabourList
During 2008, Draper made a return to British politics. He was described on the BBC television current affairs programme Newsnight, on 12 September 2008, as a Labour Campaign Advisor. Draper's position at that time was as an unpaid adviser to Ray Collins, the then General Secretary of the Labour Party.

Draper was the founder and editor of the LabourList website, which was launched in January 2009. He explained that he started the website in response to the increasing role that the internet was playing in British politics and so that Labourites would have their own place in the blogosphere. Contributors to his website included David Lammy, Peter Mandelson, James Purnell and Piers Morgan. Although LabourList was generally supportive of the Labour Party, it claimed to publish articles and views critical of the Labour government. , the website is still active.

On 11 April 2009, it was reported by The Daily Telegraph that Gordon Brown's special adviser, Damian McBride, had sent a series of emails to Draper discussing plans to set up a blog which would be used to post false rumours about the private lives of senior or prominent members of the Conservative Party and their spouses. These smears would have included sexual and personal fabrications against MP Nadine Dorries, Conservative leader David Cameron and his wife, Samantha, and Shadow Chancellor George Osborne and his wife Frances.

The emails, which had been sent from the Downing Street Press Office, found their way to Paul Staines, who brought them to the attention of the media. McBride resigned later the same day, and 10 Downing Street issued an apology for the "juvenile and inappropriate" emails. Gordon Brown sent personal letters to those who had been mentioned in the emails, expressing his regret over the incident, but Conservative politicians called for him to make a public apology. Brown apologised a few days later while on a visit to Glasgow, saying that he was sorry about what had happened.

Draper later apologised for his part in the affair. Although in his reply to McBride's email he had described the idea as "absolutely totally brilliant", Draper claimed that he only responded to the email to gain favour from Downing Street for LabourList. A closer examination of Draper's emailed reply shows the plot was far more advanced, with Draper knowing that the controversial Red Rag blogsite had already been set up and offering to sort out the technology with trade union official Andrew Dodgshon.

In the wake of the incident, Labour sought to distance itself from Draper's LabourList blog, saying that his website is not owned by the Labour Party. Draper also came under pressure to resign his post as editor of LabourList, which he did in early May, saying "I regret ever receiving the infamous email and I regret my stupid, hasty reply. I should have said straight away that the idea was wrong."

Personal life 
Draper married television presenter Kate Garraway in 2005 in Camden, London. They have two children.

COVID-19 
Draper was hospitalised in March 2020, suffering from COVID-19, and admitted to an intensive care unit. As of early June 2020 he remained in critical condition after ten weeks, and was in an induced coma. The following month, he had opened his eyes, but remained in hospital in a serious condition. As of March 2021 he remained in hospital, a year on from contracting the virus. 

Draper returned home on a trial basis in April 2021, and in May 2021, his wife gave an update on her husband stating that he is devastated by COVID-19 and still immobile. In September 2021 his wife reported he was still receiving round-the-clock care and sleeping 20 hours a day. He received treatment in Mexico in February and March 2022, however Draper's wife has decided to keep details private. She revealed in April 2022 that Draper was struggling to speak: "he can understand, sometimes do odd words, but can't express himself." Draper still requires round-the-clock care as of April 2022.

References

External links
Draper's personal website
Labour List
Journalisted – Articles by Derek Draper

1967 births
Living people
Alumni of the University of Manchester
British male journalists
Daily Mail journalists
Labour Party (UK) officials
People from Chorley
New Labour
British political consultants
British lobbyists